KGVO (1290 kHz) is an AM radio station licensed to serve Missoula, Montana.  The station is owned by Townsquare Media.  It airs a news/talk format.

The station was assigned the KGVO call letters by the Federal Radio Commission on March 17, 1931.

On May 6, 1932, the FRC authorized KGVO to move from 1420 kHz to 1200 kHz and to change to unlimited operation rather than its previous 10 a.m.-6 p.m. schedule. At that time, KGVO had 100 watts power.

KGVO has been the flagship station of Montana Grizzlies football and men's basketball for decades; it frequently brands itself as "Home of the Grizzlies."

Until 2017, KGVO simulcast on KGVO-FM at 101.5 FM, which was used to fill in the gaps when the AM station adjusted its coverage at night. However, on February 2, 2017, KGVO-FM broke off to air an alternative rock format as KAMM-FM. KGVO then began simulcasting on a low-powered translator at 98.3 FM, and Hamilton's KLYQ began simulcasting KGVO.

Ownership

In October 2007, a deal was reached for KGVO to be acquired by GAP Broadcasting II LLC (Samuel Weller, president) from Clear Channel Communications as part of a 57 station deal with a total reported sale price of $74.78 million.  What eventually became GapWest Broadcasting was folded into Townsquare Media on August 13, 2010.

Previous logo

References

External links
Official Website
 Flash Stream, MP3 Stream

FCC History Cards for KGVO

News and talk radio stations in the United States
Radio stations established in 1931
GVO
1931 establishments in Montana
Townsquare Media radio stations